Katharine Dorothea Ewart (November 26, 1870May 21, 1956) was a British historian and author of books on Italian history.

Early Life
She was born at the vicarage in Bishops Cannings, Wiltshire on 26 November 1870, the daughter of William Ewart (18181873), vicar of Bishops Cannings, and his wife, Katharine, née Matthews (18401918). After her father's death, her widowed mother settled in Bristol where Dorothea was educated at Clifton High School for Girls. She won a Clothworkers' scholarship at Somerville College, Oxford, where she took first-class honours in modern history in 1893. She served as secretary for the Oxford Association for Mental Welfare.

Family 
On 12 December 1899, she married Horace Middleton Vernon, an Oxford scholar of physiology.  The couple settled in Oxford and had five children, of whom a son and three daughters survived to adulthood.  Their eldest daughter Magdalen and their son Philip both later became eminent professors of psychology.

Published works 
Her first work was a biography of Cosimo de' Medici published in 1899 as part of Macmillan's Foreign Statesmen Series. In 1909 she published a survey of Italian history entitled Italy 1494–1790, part of the Cambridge Historical Series, which was reviewed as a welcome contribution to the subject. In 1909 she also wrote a short history of the Oxford University Museum with her husband. She coauthored Italy, Medieval and Modern, a History, published in 1917. Her final work was The Story of Italy, published in 1939.

Death 
She was widowed by her husband's death in 1951. She died in the mental hospital at Wyke House, Syon Lane, Isleworth, Middlesex, on 21 May 1956.

References

Sources

1870 births
1956 deaths
British historians
Women historians